Forest Hills Local School District is a public school district serving the southeasternmost area of Hamilton County, Ohio outside the city of Cincinnati.  The district specifically serves approximately 7,600 students from Anderson Township and the village of Newtown. There are 1,008 staff members working for the district.

The district has been rated excellent or excellent with distinction for the 12 consecutive years based on the State Report Card. It consists of nine schools:

The student progression from elementary to middle to high school in Forest Hills is noteworthy. There are six neighborhood elementary schools, all of which feed Nagel Middle School. Nagel students are then again divided based on their home addresses between the two high schools.  Anderson High School gets all students from Ayer, Maddux and Summit Elementaries.  Turpin gets all students from Wilson and Mercer Elementaries.  Sherwood Elementary students are split between Anderson and Turpin, depending on street address; students on a few designated "swing" streets may choose either high school.

Sherwood Elementary (originally called Sherwood School) and her sister Ayer Elementary, until recently, were early pioneers of the non-traditional open classroom concept that itself was philosophically rooted in the quintessentially-American one-room schoolhouse and arose in the mid-twentieth century. With no foundation walls separating instruction spaces, active noise budgeting and a collection of moveable furniture encouraged creative layouts within grade-level-specific pods. Two parallel hallways, each beginning in the cafeteria and ending in Kindergarten three-walled classrooms, were only bridged by what was once the spiritual center of most elementary schools: the library. Each library was home to a special kiva, a rarely-seen architectural feature borrowed from indigenous North American communities which, in these schools, served well as a storytelling theatre due to its natural sound-limiting effects. Obvious strengths, like the model's unrivaled ability to ensure a high-degree of  accountability for all present in the central hall (the "one room", so to speak), were not enough to impede the district's decision to implement more permanently-divisive architecture in both schools. Whilst the renovation campaigns enjoy universal popularity, the topic of necessity for the erection of divisions is met with a rich spectrum of criticism.

Forest Hills School District has also been the subject of public criticism following their decision to ban "anti-racism" teachings in schools.   Board member Sara Jonas was quoted as saying the measure was brought forward "just to make sure that both sides are always being taught to the students".

References

External links 
 https://web.archive.org/web/20121030164743/http://foresthills.edu/content_page2.aspx?cid=928

School districts in Ohio
Education in Hamilton County, Ohio